USS Prentiss (AKA-102) was a  in service with the United States Navy from 1945 to 1946. She was sold into commercial service and was scrapped in 1970.

History
Prentiss was named after Prentiss County, Mississippi. She was laid down as a Type C2-S-AJ3 ship under a Maritime Commission contract (MC hull 1699) by the North Carolina Shipbuilding Co., Wilmington, North Carolina, on 10 October 1944; launched on 6 December 1944; sponsored by Mrs. Roger Williams; acquired on loan charter basis from the Maritime Commission by the Navy on 12 January 1945; and commissioned on 11 February 1945.

World War II, 1945
After shakedown in the Chesapeake Bay area, Prentiss sailed from Norfolk for Pearl Harbor, arriving on 13 April. She departed Hawaii on 6 May with ammunition and general cargo for Okinawa. Within hours of her arrival on 21 June, she underwent one of that area's frequent attacks. During the action her gunners shot down a kamikaze. Following this spirited reception, unloading of her volatile cargo was speedy; she departed the area on 27 June. Returning to San Francisco on 28 July, she remained on the west coast until after the end of hostilities.

Post-war service 1945–46
She then loaded general cargo and sailed for Pearl Harbor and the southwest Pacific. Between October 1945 and February 1946 she carried cargo between the Philippines, the Netherlands East Indies, and Australia.

Decommissioning and sale

Returning to the US, she was decommissioned on 31 May 1946, was returned to the War Shipping Administration on 1 June 1946, and was struck from the Navy List on 19 June 1946.

On 15 October 1947 the Maritime Administration sold the ship to the Aluminum Company of America, who renamed her Alcoa Ranger. A little less than two decades later, the Cortez Shipping Corporation bought her and renamed her Cortez. Cortez Shipping sold her on 13 May 1969 to Crest Overseas Shipping Company, who renamed her Jody Re on 26 November 1969. On 18 December 1969 she ran aground off the coast of Nicaragua while en route from Lake Charles, Louisiana to Saigon (now known as Ho Chi Minh City), South Vietnam. The damaged ship was towed to Mobile, Alabama for possible repair but it was assessed to be uneconomical to repair her. She was sold for scrap on 18 March 1970, towed across the Atlantic Ocean, and scrapped at Bilbao, Spain.

Awards
Prentiss was awarded one battle star for World War II service.

References

 Ship History at NavSource

External links

 
 51 Years of AKAs

 

1944 ships
Ships built in Wilmington, North Carolina
Tolland-class attack cargo ships
Prentiss County, Mississippi
World War II amphibious warfare vessels of the United States